The 1958–59 NBA season was the Nationals' 10th season in the NBA.

Regular season

Season standings

x – clinched playoff spot

Record vs. opponents

Game log

Playoffs

|- align="center" bgcolor="#ccffcc" 
| 1
| March 13
| @ New York
| W 129–123
| Dolph Schayes (35)
| Madison Square Garden III
| 1–0
|- align="center" bgcolor="#ccffcc" 
| 2
| March 15
| New York
| W 131–115
| Red Kerr (34)
| Onondaga War Memorial
| 2–0
|-

|- align="center" bgcolor="#ffcccc" 
| 1
| March 18
| @ Boston
| L 109–131
| George Yardley (30)
| George Yardley (17)
| —
| Boston Garden
| 0–1
|- align="center" bgcolor="#ccffcc" 
| 2
| March 21
| Boston
| W 120–118
| Dolph Schayes (34)
| Schayes, Kerr (17)
| —
| Onondaga War Memorial
| 1–1
|- align="center" bgcolor="#ffcccc" 
| 3
| March 22
| @ Boston
| L 111–133
| Dolph Schayes (21)
| Connie Dierking (11)
| —
| Boston Garden
| 1–2
|- align="center" bgcolor="#ccffcc" 
| 4
| March 25
| Boston
| W 119–107
| Dolph Schayes (28)
| Dolph Schayes (18)
| —
| Onondaga War Memorial
| 2–2
|- align="center" bgcolor="#ffcccc" 
| 5
| March 28
| @ Boston
| L 108–129
| George Yardley (23)
| Schayes, Kerr (11)
| —
| Boston Garden
| 2–3
|- align="center" bgcolor="#ccffcc" 
| 6
| March 29
| Boston
| W 133–121
| Dolph Schayes (39)
| Dolph Schayes (12)
| —
| Onondaga War Memorial
| 3–3
|- align="center" bgcolor="#ffcccc" 
| 7
| April 1
| @ Boston
| L 125–130
| Dolph Schayes (35)
| Dolph Schayes (16)
| Schayes, Costello (9)
| Boston Garden
| 3–4
|-

Awards and records
Dolph Schayes, All-NBA Second Team

References

Philadelphia 76ers seasons
Syracuse